Dan Mori (born as Dean (Din) Mori, ; on 8 November 1988) is an Israeli footballer who plays as a centre-back.

Club career

Bnei Yehuda Tel Aviv

Mori began his football career, playing for Bnei Yehuda Tel Aviv and joined the club since he was thirteen. Mori was then promoted to the first team squad in 2008. In the 2008–09 season, Mori scored his first European goal, in the first leg of second round of the Europa League, as Bnei Yehuda Tel Aviv wins 4–0 against Dinaburg.

In the Israel State Cup, Mori played in the final, as his side lose 3–1 against Hapoel Tel Aviv. In his Bnei Yehuda Tel Aviv career, Mori made 123 appearances and scoring four times.

Vitesse
In the summer of 2012, Mori joined Dutch Eredivisie club Vitesse Arnhem on a three-year contract, with the fee believed to be €300,000. After spending two months on the bench, Mori finally made his debut for the club, and his first start, in a 2–2 draw with Groningen on 27 October 2012. However, in his first season, Mori spent most of his time on the bench, without being called to the pitch. This continuously happens onwards in the 2013–14 season. Mori quoted on his time at Vitesse in an interview: ''"I do not get the minutes I want to get, I did not go to serve as decor. While difficult, do not even go to sea."

Mori was refused entry to the United Arab Emirates, where Vitesse had arranged a training camp in January 2014, because of his nationality.

Bnei Yehuda Tel Aviv
On 25 October 2015, Mori returned to Bnei Yehuda Tel Aviv.

Beitar Jerusalem
On 9 June 2016, Mori signed with Beitar Jerusalem for two years.

International career
In 2008, Mori was called up by Israel U21 squad and two years later, Mori was called up by the Israel. On 3 March 2010, Mori made his debut, coming on as a substitute in the 70th minute for Tal Ben Haim, in a 2–0 win over Romania.

Personal life
In 2011, Mori changed his name from Dean to Dan because he believed the name "Dean means 'trial', and Jewish people shouldn't be called by that name". It was Chaim Kanievsky who was responsible for changing his name.

References

External links
 
 Voetbal International profile 

1988 births
Living people
Israeli Jews
Israeli footballers
Association football central defenders
Israel international footballers
Bnei Yehuda Tel Aviv F.C. players
SBV Vitesse players
Beitar Jerusalem F.C. players
Israeli Premier League players
Eredivisie players
Footballers from Tel Aviv
Israeli expatriate footballers
Expatriate footballers in the Netherlands
Israeli expatriate sportspeople in the Netherlands